WEEO-FM is a Conservative Talk Radio formatted broadcast radio station licensed to McConnellsburg, Pennsylvania, serving the Chambersburg/Hagerstown.  WEEO-FM is owned and operated by Michael Stapleford, through licensee Magnum Broadcasting, Inc.

References

External links
 NewsTalk 103.7FM Online
 

EEO-FM
Radio stations established in 1997
Talk radio stations in the United States